Harry Tyson-Wilson (born 29 December 1996) is an English professional rugby league footballer who plays for Dewsbury Rams in the Betfred Championship.

Background
Harry is the brother of  Bobby Tyson-Wilson, who also plays for Sheffield Eagles and George Tyson-Wilson who is a Royal Marine Commando. Son of ex Hull FC, Hull KR, Hunslet Hawks and Doncaster Dragons player Rob Wilson who is currently a coach with the Hull KR youth set up.

Career
Tyson-Wilson made his Hull F.C. début on 7 September 2014 off the interchange bench in a Super League match against Huddersfield.
In December 2016 he signed a one-year contract with League 1 side York City Knights having previously played for them on loan earlier in the year. In October 2017 he signed a one-year contract with Hunslet.

On 14 October 2020 it was announced that he had signed for Sheffield Eagles

References

External links
Hunslet profile
(archived by web.archive.org) Hull profile (Archive copy: 4 March 2016)

1996 births
Living people
Dewsbury Rams players
Doncaster R.L.F.C. players
English rugby league players
Hull F.C. players
Hunslet R.L.F.C. players
Rugby league players from Kingston upon Hull
Rugby league halfbacks
Sheffield Eagles players
York City Knights players